Lidija Bradara (born 17 August 1971) is a Bosnian Croat politician who is the 11th and current president of the Federation of Bosnia and Herzegovina. She was previously a member of the national House of Peoples from 2019 to 2023.

Bradara has been member of the Croatian Democratic Union since 2000.

See also
Croatian Democratic Union of Bosnia and Herzegovina
House of Peoples of Bosnia and Herzegovina

References

External links

Lidija Bradara at imovinapoliticara.cin.ba

1971 births
Living people
People from Kiseljak
Politicians of the Federation of Bosnia and Herzegovina
Croatian Democratic Union of Bosnia and Herzegovina politicians
Members of the House of Peoples of Bosnia and Herzegovina
Presidents of the Federation of Bosnia and Herzegovina